The men's 10 km competition at the 2014 South American Games took place on March 16 at the C.A.R. Laguna Curauma.

Results
The race was started at 10:00.

References

Swimming at the 2014 South American Games